Whitehill is a family surname, appearing both in literature and in historical references.

People surnamed Whitehill
Cat Whitehill, American soccer player
Clarence Eugene Whitehill (1871–1932), American opera singer
Robert Whitehill, American poet
Robert Whitehill (Pennsylvania politician), US Representative from Pennsylvania
Walter Muir Whitehill, American author, historian and medievalist
Lolly Whitehill, fictional character in Orange is the New Black

Whitehills in literature
As fictional family, the Whitehills are featured in the short stories of Brazilian writer Rita Maria Felix da Silva.

The first reference to them was Lord Douglas Whitehill in "San Juan Romero". The complete list of Whitehills and where they appeared is listed below:

‹›  Lord Douglas Whitehill in "San Juan Romero". 
‹›  Walter and Edgar Whitehill in "O Tesouro de Omalura" (The Treasure of Omalura)
‹›  Adam Whitehill, a vampire in "Adam e Sarah" (Adam and Sarah)
‹›  Agnes Whitehill in "Uma Epifania para Agnes" (Epiphany For Agnes)
‹›  Quentin Whitehill, a scientists in "Seria Melhor..." (It would be better...)
‹›  Peter Whitehill in "O Contrário da Sorte" (Contrary of the Luck)
‹›  Lucius Whitehill, a businessman/gangster/collector cited in epilogue of "Khen-Zur"
‹›  Kate Whitehill, the rough agent first appeared in "Quando Kate Visitou Debby em Julho" (When Kate Visited Debby in July). Kate and her partner (Ken McSmith)then returned in  "Jogo de Facas" (A Game of Knives), "Cacos de Porcelana" (Porcelain Shards) and "O Legado do Demônio de Barro" (The Legacy of the Clay Demon), all three short stories written by Daniel Folador Rossi, a Brazilian writer and a friend of Rita Maria Felix da Silva.

Generally in these tales, the Whitehills are shown involved at substantial problems. There is a tendency of the readers to consider them as an "evil family" while other ones state is just "bad luck".

The fictional Whitehills originated from London.

There is also a reference to a Whitehill (Victoria?) in Bram Stoker's Dracula.

Whitehills in Media
David Whitehill is an Australian TV presenter/producer and ocean conservationist: http://www.davidwhitehill.com/

Another Whitehill in sports history – Earl Whitehill https://www.baseball-reference.com/players/w/whiteea01.shtml

Whitehills in History
The Whitehills are also a real family originating in the 15th century in Calais and later appearing in Scotland. The Whitehills emigrated to the United States in the mid 18th century. A James Whitehill fought in the Revolutionary war against the British. Camphill, Pennsylvania was originally called Whitehill, but changed its name during the American Civil War in respect to a group of soldiers who had camped there.